The Brown Grey River is a river of New Zealand. It is an upper tributary of the Grey River, flowing from the slopes of Mount Kemp, close to the township of Springs Junction, and flowing southeast for  before reaching the upper Grey River.

See also
List of rivers of New Zealand

References

Rivers of the West Coast, New Zealand
Rivers of New Zealand